Marcel Triboulet (26 January 1890 – 30 April 1939) was a French footballer. He played in six matches for the France national football team from 1911 to 1919. He was also named in France's squad for the football tournament at the 1912 Summer Olympics, but the French side withdrew from the competition. 

He died in a car accident at the age of 49.

References

External links
 

1890 births
1939 deaths
French footballers
France international footballers
Association football wingers
Racing Club de France Football players